Harm Zeinstra (born 21 July 1989) is a Dutch former professional footballer who played as a goalkeeper.

External links
 
 Voetbal International profile 

1989 births
Living people
Dutch footballers
FC Emmen players
SC Cambuur players
Eredivisie players
Eerste Divisie players
Footballers from Leeuwarden
Association football goalkeepers